John Gooding Priest (June 23, 1891 – November 4, 1979) was a Major League Baseball infielder. He played in 10 games for the New York Highlanders over two seasons ( and ), five of them at second base.

Sources

Major League Baseball second basemen
New York Highlanders players
Danville Red Sox players
Rochester Hustlers players
Montreal Royals players
Richmond Climbers players
Bridgeport Americans players
Baseball players from Missouri
1891 births
1979 deaths